Slipgate Ironworks ApS (formerly Interceptor Entertainment ApS and Slipgate Studios ApS) is a Danish video game developer based in Aalborg, founded in 2010 by Frederik Schreiber.

History 
Interceptor Entertainment was founded in 2010 by managing director Frederik Schreiber, at the time based in Herning. The company's first project was Duke Nukem 3D: Reloaded, a fan remake of Duke Nukem 3D announced in October 2010 but put on hold in September 2011. In February 2014, Interceptor teased a new game titled Duke Nukem: Mass Destruction. In response, Gearbox Software, the owners of the Duke Nukem trademark, filed a lawsuit against the company. The game's name was changed to Bombshell by May. In March 2014, Interceptor part-owner SDN Invest acquired 3D Realms.

In September 2016, Interceptor and 3D Realms announced Rad Rodgers, a platform game running on Unreal Engine 4 and starring the title character and his console-come-to-life friend Dusty (voiced by Jon St. John). The studio started a Kickstarter crowdfunding campaign with an aim of $50,000, raising a total of $81,861 within 30 days. In March 2017, Interceptor announced that it was restructuring, expecting to assume a new name within the following months. The studio rebranded as Slipgate Studios and sold the Rad Rogers intellectual property off to THQ Nordic. To avoid confusion with an eponymous company based in Las Vegas, Slipgate Studios changed its name to Slipgate Ironworks, the name of a defunct company formerly run by John Romero, in March 2019.

In August 2021, Embracer Group announced that they acquired the company through Saber Interactive, which will be the parent company.

Games developed

Cancelled 
 Duke Nukem 3D: Reloaded
 Devil's Hunt (ports)

Notes

References

External links 
 

Companies based in Aalborg
Video game companies established in 2010
Danish companies established in 2010
Video game companies of Denmark
2021 mergers and acquisitions
Saber Interactive